Javier Gallo González (born 6 August 1983) is a Mexican professional boxer.

Professional career
In May 2011, Gallo lost a majority decision to former world champion Rodel Mayol on Showtime's televised portion of the Pacquiao vs. Mosley undercard.

On September 9, 2011 at the "War at Woodland Hills 5", Gallo won with a TKO over Jason Rorie.

References

External links
Javier Gallo on Facebook

Boxers from Baja California
Sportspeople from Tijuana
Bantamweight boxers
1985 births
Living people
Mexican male boxers